Quinzio Rustici (died 1566) was a Roman Catholic prelate who served as Bishop of Mileto (1523–1566).

Biography
Quinzio Rustici was born in Rome, Italy.
On 26 November 1523, he was appointed during the papacy of Pope Clement VII as Bishop of Mileto.
On 19 March 1535, he was consecrated bishop by Girolamo Grimaldi, Cardinal-Deacon of San Giorgio in Velabro.
He served as Bishop of Mileto until his death in 1566.

References

External links and additional sources
 (for Chronology of Bishops) 
 (for Chronology of Bishops) 

16th-century Italian Roman Catholic bishops
Bishops appointed by Pope Clement VII
1566 deaths